How to Cut & Paste: The Thirties Edition is a studio album mixed by DJ Yoda. It is the fifth album in his Cut & Paste series.

Track listing
 Danny Kaye - "Beatin Bangin Scratchin"
 Benny Goodman - "One O'Clock Jump"
 Danny Kaye - "Ballin The Jack"
 Louis Armstrong - "Cheesecake"
 Cab Calloway - "Minnie The Moocher"
 Thelonious Monk - "Black And Tan Fantasy"
 Thelonious Monk - "Caravan"
 Moondog - "Lament 1, Birds Lament"
 Jeri Southern - "An Occasional Man"
 Duke of Iron (Cecil Anderson) - "Ugly Woman"
 Slim Gaillard - "Yip Roc Heresy"
 Benny Goodman - "Ding Dong Daddy"
 Champion Jack Dupree - "Walking The Blues"
 Fats Waller - "Reefer Song"
 Cab Calloway - "Reefer Man"
 Duke Ellington - "Don't Mean a Thing"
 Henry Thomas - "Red River Blues"
 Harry McClintock - "Big Rock Candy Mountain"
 Vera Ward Hall - "Trouble So Hard"
 Bessie Jones - "Sometimes"
 Robert Johnson - "Hellhound on my Trail"
 The Marx Brothers - "Hello I must be Going"

DJ Yoda albums
DJ mix albums
2009 compilation albums